Filigree & Shadow is the second album released by 4AD collective This Mortal Coil, an umbrella title for a loose grouping of guest musicians and vocalists brought together by label boss Ivo Watts-Russell. The supergroup consists primarily of artists attached to the 4AD label, of which Watts-Russell was the co-founder and (at the time) the owner and director. The album was released in September 1986, and entered the UK Independent Music chart on 11 October 1986 and peaked at #2, spending 16 weeks on the chart in total.

Of the 25 tracks, 13 are instrumental, including the title track. This was the first double-LP released on 4AD, and introduced the "DAD" (for double album) prefix into the label's catalogue. Watts-Russell took careful consideration in shaping the album's four sides so they flowed together as individual wholes. This is lost somewhat on compact disc, as the entire album fits on one CD.

A remastered and repackaged CD edition of Filigree & Shadow was issued with the complete This Mortal Coil recordings in a self-titled box set, released in late November 2011. The CD was released individually shortly thereafter.

Track listing

Double vinyl LP (DAD 609)

CD (DAD 609 CD)

Personnel
Musicians

 Dominic Appleton (Breathless) – vocals
 Deirdre Rutkowski – vocals
 Louise Rutkowski – vocals
 Simon Raymonde (Cocteau Twins) – guitar, bass, keyboards
 Richard Thomas (Dif Juz) – saxophone
 David Curtis (Dif Juz) – guitar
 Jon Turner – keyboards
 Alison Limerick – vocals
 Jean (recorded as Jeanette on Survival Records) – vocals
 Peter Ulrich (Dead Can Dance) – percussion
 Keith Mitchell – guitar
 Nigel K. Hine – guitar
 Anne Turner – background vocals
 Les McKeown – background vocals
 Martin McCarrick – background vocals
 Hubertus "Richenel" Baars – vocals
 Chris Pye – guitar
 Caroline Seaman (Heavenly Bodies, ex-members of Dead Can Dance) – vocals
 Alan Curtis (Dif Juz) – guitar
 Mark Cox (The Wolfgang Press) – keyboards
 Andrew Gray (The Wolfgang Press) – guitar
 Steven Young (Colourbox) – drum programming
 Tony Waera – didgeridoo
 Gini Ball – violin, viola
 John Fryer – programming
 Ivo Watts-Russell – music, keyboards

Visual
 Concept and art direction by Ivo Watts-Russell and Nigel Grierson
 Photography by Nigel Grierson
 Design by Vaughan Oliver at v23
 Design assistance by Erwin Esen
 Cover model: Pallas Citroën

References

External links
 Filigree & Shadow at Discogs

1986 albums
4AD albums
Albums produced by John Fryer (producer)
Albums produced by Ivo Watts-Russell
This Mortal Coil albums